Sol Spiegelman (December 14, 1914 – January 21, 1983) was an American molecular biologist.  He developed the technique of nucleic acid hybridization, which helped to lay the groundwork for advances in recombinant DNA technology.

Early life and education
Spiegelman was born in Brooklyn, New York City in 1914. He attended the City College of New York and was initially interested in biology, but found the courses uninspiring and instead chose to focus on math and physics. During his undergraduate work he took a leave of absence to work in a biology laboratory, where he studied the genetics of bacteria. He graduated in 1939 with a bachelor's degree in mathematics. He then began his graduate studies at Columbia University in 1940, studying cellular physiology under the supervision of H.B. Steinbach. Spiegelman joined Steinbach in his move to Washington University School of Medicine two years later, and received his PhD from that institution in 1944. His graduate work focused on what was then known as enzymatic "induction" or "adaptation", now known to reflect changes in gene expression in response to environmental factors. He continued to work at Washington University until 1948, and then took a one-year Public Health Service fellowship at the University of Minnesota.

Academic career
In 1949, Spiegelman joined the faculty at the University of Illinois, where he would spend the next 20 years of his academic career. His research in this time focused on nucleic acids and particularly on the enzymes associated with nucleic acid synthesis, originating from work on bacteriophage with RNA genomes such as MS2 phage and bacteriophage Qβ. His work with Qβ RNA led to a noted  experiment with self reproducing RNA structures called Spiegelman's Monster. Among his best-known work is his research on nucleic acid hybridization, much of which was conducted in along with Kim Atwood and Ferruccio Ritossa building on work by Rich and Davies in 1956, which helped to lay the groundwork for advances in recombinant DNA technology.

Spiegelman's later research focused on cancer and in 1969 he moved to the Columbia University College of Physicians and Surgeons, becoming a professor of human genetics and development as well as the directory of the Institute of Cancer Research. He was particularly interested in potential viral causes of cancer. In 1975, he was named University Professor.

Awards and honors

Spiegelman received the Lasker Award in 1974 for his 1965 work on Qβ RNA. In 1981 he received the Antonio Feltrinelli International prize in Biology for his contributions to molecular biology. He was elected to the United States National Academy of Sciences in 1965 American Academy of Arts and Sciences a year later.

Personal life
Spiegelman and his wife Helen had three children. He died of pancreatic cancer in 1983.

See also
Spiegelman Monster

References

External links

Sol Spiegelman Papers (1929-1983) - National Library of Medicine finding aid
The Sol Spiegelman Papers - Profiles in Science, National Library of Medicine

1914 births
1983 deaths
American molecular biologists
People from Brooklyn
Jewish American scientists
Columbia University faculty
Recipients of the Albert Lasker Award for Basic Medical Research
Scientists from New York (state)
Members of the United States National Academy of Sciences
Fellows of the American Academy of Arts and Sciences
City College of New York alumni
20th-century American biologists
American biologists
Washington University School of Medicine alumni
Deaths from cancer in New York (state)